The 2018 All-Ireland Senior Camogie Championship – known as the Liberty Insurance Camogie Championship for sponsorship reasons – is the premier inter-county competition of the 2018 camogie season.

The championship began on 9 June and ended on 9 September with Cork retaining the O'Duffy Cup.

Teams

Eleven county teams compete in the Senior Championship. 19 lower-ranked county teams compete in the Intermediate and Junior Championships.

Format

Group Stage

The eleven teams are drawn into two groups of five and six. Each team plays the other teams in their group once. Three points are awarded for a win and one for a draw.

Knock-out stage

The two group runners-up and the two third-placed teams play in two quarter-finals.
The two group winners and the two quarter-final winners play in two semi-finals.
The semi-final winners contest the 2018 All-Ireland Senior Camogie Championship Final

Group stage

Group 1

Group 1 Table

Group 2

Group 2 Table

Knock-out stage

Quarter-finals

Semi-finals

Final

References

External links
 Camogie Association

2018 in camogie
2018